The 1934–1935 SM-sarja season was played between 3 Teams from 2 cities. 

Each team played 4 games each. The winner of the championship was decided during the season.

SM-sarja championship 

Helsingin Jalkapalloklubi wins the 1934–35 SM-sarja championship

References
 Hockey Archives

Liiga seasons
1934–35 in Finnish ice hockey
Fin